Aurangabad West Assembly constituency is one of the six constituencies of Maharashtra Vidhan Sabha located in Aurangabad district.

It is a part of the Aurangabad (Lok Sabha constituency) along with five other assembly constituencies, viz Vaijapur Assembly constituency, Gangapur, Maharashtra Assembly constituency, Aurangabad East Assembly constituency, Kannad Assembly constituency and Aurangabad Central Assembly constituency (SC)

Members of Legislative Assembly

Key

Election results

Assembly Elections 2004

Assembly Elections 2009

Assembly Elections 2014

Assembly Elections 2019

References
2.   Map Ward's Distribution

https://in.docworkspace.com/d/sIE7Jq6we67fpmwY?sa=e1&st=0t

External links 
 https://www.firstpost.com/maharashtra-assembly-elections/aurangabad-west-election-results-2019-s13a108
 http://results.eci.gov.in/ACOCT2019/ConstituencywiseS13108.htm?ac=108
 http://myneta.info/maharashtra2019/candidate.php?candidate_id=10422

Assembly constituencies of Maharashtra
Government of Aurangabad, Maharashtra
Year of establishment missing